Martina Navratilova was the defending champion.

Second-seeded Andrea Jaeger won the title, defeating fifth-seeded Virginia Wade in the final 6–3, 6–1.

Seeds
A champion seed is indicated in bold text while text in italics indicates the round in which that seed was eliminated. 

  Martina Navratilova (second round)
  Andrea Jaeger (champion)
  Wendy Turnbull (second round)
  Barbara Jordan (quarterfinals)
  Virginia Wade (final)
  Mima Jaušovec (quarterfinals)
  Sue Barker (quarterfinals)
 N.A.

Draw

Final

References

External links
 Main draw

Silicon Valley Classic
1981 WTA Tour